Assam-type architecture is a architectural style developed in the state of Assam in India during the late modern period. It is found in Assam and Sylhet region. The houses constructed using this style are generally termed as Assam-type houses, consisting usually one or more storeys. The houses are built to be earthquake proof, and are made from materials ranging from wood and bamboo to steel and concrete.

History 
Before the arrival of the British in India, affluent families in Assam lived in expensive, elaborately constructed houses, while the others survived in huts made from mud-plastered bamboo walls and thatched roofs. With the knowledge of and access to modern science, British engineers assessed the natural environment and designed and constructed buildings that are now known as Assam-type buildings.

Present day 
The present-day Assam-type buildings are a result of architectural changes that were introduced in colonial Assam.

Elements of Assam-type style

The structure 
Buildings are constructed on both flat and sloped terrains. On flat grounds, the buildings are typically rectangular or L or C layout. On other surfaces, such as highlands, they are usually rectangular in shape, accessed via the hillside. The roof is typically erected by high gables to overcome heavy rainfall in the region, where walls are usually timber-framed, plastered with cement. With high ceilings and well-ventilated rooms, the floorings are either wooden or concrete with tiled, mosaic or stone surfacing with stilts.

The configuration 
The general design of a residential building incorporates a living room, verandah, kitchen, besides bedrooms and bathrooms. Some may additionally feature long corridors, connecting rooms, especially buildings such as schools and colleges.

References 

Architecture of Assam
House styles
House types